Sebastian Helbig (born 25 April 1977) is a German former professional footballer who played as a forward.

References

External links
 
 
 

1977 births
Living people
German footballers
Germany youth international footballers
Association football midfielders
Association football forwards
Bundesliga players
2. Bundesliga players
FC Rot-Weiß Erfurt players
Bayer 04 Leverkusen players
Bayer 04 Leverkusen II players
FC Energie Cottbus players
1. FC Köln players
SpVgg Unterhaching players
FC Erzgebirge Aue players
FC Carl Zeiss Jena players
Dynamo Dresden players
FSV Zwickau players
People from Gotha (town)
Footballers from Thuringia